Turkey Run is a  long 1st order tributary to Shellpot Creek in New Castle County, Delaware.

Course
Turkey Run rises in Forest Hills Park, Delaware and then flows south-southeast to join Shellpot Creek at Bellefonte, Delaware.

Watershed
Turkey Run drains  of area, receives about 47.2 in/year of precipitation, has a topographic wetness index of 495.08 and is about 20% forested.

See also
List of Delaware rivers

References

Rivers of Delaware
Rivers of New Castle County, Delaware
Tributaries of the Delaware River